Donald Munroe Cornock (1 August 1930 – 1969) was a Scottish footballer who played for Albion Rovers, Clyde, Dumbarton, Stranraer and Stirling Albion.

Cornock died in Coatbridge in 1969, at the age of 39.

References

1930 births
1969 deaths
Scottish footballers
Dumbarton F.C. players
Albion Rovers F.C. players
Clyde F.C. players
Stranraer F.C. players
Stirling Albion F.C. players
Scottish Football League players
Association football wing halves